Scoparia pallidula is a moth in the family Crambidae. It is endemic to New Zealand.

Taxonomy

This species was described by Alfred Philpott in 1928. However the placement of this species within the genus Scoparia is in doubt. As a result, this species has also been referred to as Scoparia (s.l.) pallidula.

Description

The wingspan is about 18 mm. The forewings are white, irrorated with pale brownish. The veins are outlined with blackish and a terminal series of black spots. The hindwings are grey with a slight ochreous tinge. Adults have been recorded on wing in December and January.

References

Moths described in 1928
Moths of New Zealand
Scorparia
Endemic fauna of New Zealand
Endemic moths of New Zealand